Statesville Commercial Historic District is a national historic district located at Statesville, Iredell County, North Carolina.  It encompasses 54 contributing buildings in the central business district of Statesville.  The district includes notable examples of Late Victorian architecture dated between about 1875 and 1925. Located in the district are the separately listed U.S. Post Office and County Courthouse and Iredell County Courthouse. Other notable buildings include the First A. R. Presbyterian Church, former County Jail, the U. S. Post Office, former Walton and Gage Store (c. 1885), Miller Block (c. 1885), Madison Building, former Merchants and Farmers Bank (1908), former Carolina Motor Company (1916), former Montgomery Ward Store, and former First National Bank.

It was listed on the National Register of Historic Places in 1980.

Gallery

References

Historic American Buildings Survey in North Carolina
Historic districts on the National Register of Historic Places in North Carolina
Victorian architecture in North Carolina
Geography of Iredell County, North Carolina
National Register of Historic Places in Iredell County, North Carolina